Yoldiidae is a taxonomic family of small to medium-sized saltwater clams, marine bivalve molluscs in the order Nuculanida.

Genera and species
Genera and species within the family Yoldiidae include:
 Megayoldia
 Megayoldia martyria
 Megayoldia montereyensis  
 Megayoldia thraciaeformis 
 Microgloma Saunders & Allen, 1973
 Microgloma guilonardi (D. F. Hoeksema, 1993)
 Microgloma macaron Benaim & Absalão, 2011
 Microgloma mirmidina (Dautzenberg & H. Fischer, 1897)
 Microgloma nhanduti Benaim & Absalão, 2011
 Microgloma pusilla (Jeffreys, 1879)
 Microgloma turnerae H. L. Sanders & Allen, 1973
 Microgloma yongei H. L. Sanders & Allen, 1973
 Portlandia
 Portlandia aestuariorum 
 Portlandia arctica 
 Portlandia beringii
 Portlandia dalli  
 Portlandia fraterna
 Portlandia frigida 
 Portlandia glacialis
 Portlandia inconspicua 
 Portlandia inflata
 Portlandia intermedia 
 Portlandia iris
 Portlandia jeffreysi
 Portlandia lenticula 
 Portlandia lucida
 Portlandia minuscula
 Portlandia sericea
 Portlandia subangulata 
 Portlandia tamara
 Yoldia Möller, 1842
 Yoldia amygdalea 
 Yoldia beringiana
 Yoldia cooperii 
 Yoldia excavata 
 Yoldia glacialis
 Yoldia hyperborea 
 Yoldia limatula (Say, 1831)
 Yoldia martyria 
 Yoldia micrometrica
 Yoldia montereyensis 
 Yoldia myalis (Couthouy, 1838)
 Yoldia regularis 
 Yoldia sapotilla (Gould, 1841)
 Yoldia scissurata 
 Yoldia secunda
 Yoldia seminuda 
 Yoldia solenoides
 Yoldia thraciaeformis Storer, 1838
 Yoldiella

 Yoldiella cecinella 
 Yoldiella curta
 Yoldiella dicella
 Yoldiella dissimilis 
 Yoldiella expansa
 Yoldiella fraterna 
 Yoldiella frigida 
 Yoldiella inconspicua 
 Yoldiella inflata 
 Yoldiella insculpta
 Yoldiella intermedia 
 Yoldiella iris 
 Yoldiella jeffreysi
 Yoldiella lenticula 
 Yoldiella lucida 
 Yoldiella nana 
 Yoldiella oleacina 
 Yoldiella orcia 
 Yoldiella pachia Verrill & Bush, 1898
 Yoldiella philippiana 
 Yoldiella profundorum
 Yoldiella propinqua 
 Yoldiella pusilla
 Yoldiella sagamiana T. Okutani & K. Fujikura, 2022
 Yoldiella sanesia
 Yoldiella siliqua
 Yoldiella striolata
 Yoldiella subaequilatera 
 Yoldiella subangulata

References
 

 
Bivalve families